The Amercentrale is a coal-fired power plant of RWE in the municipality Geertruidenberg.  The plant is named after the Amer River and is located on the left bank of this river.  In 1952 Unit 1 of the first Amercentrale began generating electricity. The much smaller Dongecentrale, decommissioned in 2011, is located near the Amercentrale.

Technical specifications 
The power plant generates 600 MW of power as well as heat for heating homes and greenhouses. The plant provides a large part of southern Netherlands with electric power and also supplies heat to the horticultural areas. Since unit 8 was decommissioned in 2015, only unit 9, which has been in operation since 1993, is still in use. Plans to build a new coal and biomass-fired unit of about 800 MW have been scrapped. Unit 9 could be closed in the near future in a bid to achieve climate goals, if another solution can be found for the district heating in the nearby towns of Breda and Tilburg.

References 

The Amercentrale on the site of Essent

Coal-fired power stations in the Netherlands
RWE
Geertruidenberg